Mohammed Hamdi al-Ahdal is a citizen of Saudi Arabia who played a role in the
attack on the French supertanker MV Limburg.
The attack occurred in October 2002, in the Gulf of Aden, off Yemen.
One Bulgarian crew member was killed.  Twelve crew members were injured.  90,000 tonnes of oil were spilled.
Al-Ahdal was captured in Yemen on November 25, 2003.

During the 90s' he fought in Bosnia and Chechnya.

According to Global Security Al-Ahdal was born in 1971, and received a three-year sentence.
The Prosecution appealed, because they thought the original sentence was too lenient.
However, the original sentence was upheld.

Fawaz al-Rabihi, also convicted of a role in the bombing, received a life sentence.

References

1971 births
Year of birth uncertain
Living people
Saudi Arabian al-Qaeda members